San Pedro, Oaxaca may refer to:

San Pedro Amuzgos
San Pedro Apóstol 
San Pedro Atoyac
San Pedro Cajonos
San Pedro Comitancillo
San Pedro Coxcaltepec Cántaros
San Pedro El Alto
San Pedro Huamelula
San Pedro Huilotepec
San Pedro Ixcatlán
San Pedro Ixtlahuaca
San Pedro Jaltepetongo
San Pedro Jicayan
San Pedro Jocotipac
San Pedro Juchatengo
San Pedro Molinos
San Pedro Nopala
San Pedro Ocopetatillo
San Pedro Ocotepec
San Pedro Pochutla
San Pedro Quiatoni
San Pedro Sochiapam
San Pedro Tapanatepec
San Pedro Taviche
San Pedro Teozacoalco
San Pedro Teutila 
San Pedro Tidaá
San Pedro Topiltepec 
San Pedro Totolapa 
San Pedro Yaneri 
San Pedro Yólox
San Pedro Yucunama

See also
San Pedro Mártir (disambiguation)
San Pedro Mixtepec (disambiguation)
San Pedro y San Pablo (disambiguation)